John Doe is the pseudonym used by the whistleblower in the 2016 Panama Papers leak, who turned over 11.5 million documents from the law firm Mossack Fonseca to the newspaper . On May 5, 2016, Doe published a statement titled The Revolution Will Be Digitized; Doe explained they made the files public to underline growing income inequality and financial corruption globally. The whistleblower has offered to help prosecutors build their cases, on the condition of legal protection.

Initial contact with 
In 2014, Doe contacted Bastian Obermayer, a reporter working for German newspaper , with the message "Hello. This is John Doe. Interested in data?" When Obermayer answered in the affirmative, Doe continued, saying, "There are a couple of conditions. My life is in danger. We will only chat over encrypted files. No meeting, ever." When Obermayer asked Doe why they were leaking the data, Doe responded that they sought to "make these crimes public." Doe then proceeded to transfer roughly 11.5 million documents from the records of Panamanian law firm Mossack Fonseca. When the data was eventually released to the public, it became known as the Panama Papers.

The Revolution Will Be Digitized 
Doe issued a statement through  on May 5, 2016, explaining the motivation for releasing the massive trove of files.

In the statement, titled The Revolution Will Be Digitized, Doe cited growing global income inequality and corruption allegedly enabled by Mossack Fonseca as motivation for releasing the papers. Doe also said the papers demonstrated the injustices perpetrated by the industry that creates offshore companies and blamed governments for allowing offshore havens to proliferate, saying they leaked the documents "simply because I understood enough about their contents to realise the scale of the injustices they described." Doe added that they had never worked for any government or intelligence agency and expressed willingness to help prosecutors. After  verified that it was from the Panama Papers source, the International Consortium of Investigative Journalists (ICIJ) posted the full written statement on its website.

Notes

References

Unidentified whistleblowers
Living people
Panama Papers
Year of birth missing (living people)